John F. King is a retired American military officer and the state of Georgia's Insurance and Safety Fire Commissioner. He was appointed by Governor Brian Kemp as commissioner on July 1, 2019, replacing Jim Beck. Beck was elected in 2018, but suspended by Governor Kemp on May 16, 2019, pending an investigation into allegations of illegal activity committed prior to his taking office. After Beck's conviction of 37 criminal counts of fraud and money laundering on July 22, 2021, Beck was fully and immediately removed from office as per Georgia law, and King became the permanent insurance commissioner. King was re-elected to this position in 2022. King's appointment makes him the first Hispanic statewide official in Georgia's history. A native of Mexico, King is fluent in Spanish.

King has also served as the chief of police for Doraville, Georgia, after becoming an Atlanta police officer in 1985. King received a bachelor's degree in criminal justice and public administration from Brenau University and a master's degree in Strategic Studies from the United States Army War College. He is also a graduate of the FBI National Academy in Quantico, Virginia, and a graduate of the Georgia International Law Enforcement Exchange program to Israel (GILEE) which was started in preparation for the 1996 Olympic Games in Atlanta as a way to enhance cooperation between Georgia's law enforcement agencies and the police force of the Israel especially in the areas of counter-terrorism and drug interdiction.

King also serves as a major general in the United States National Guard. He was the commander of the 48th Infantry Brigade Combat Team.  King has been deployed to Bosnia-Herzegovina, Iraq, and Afghanistan where he served as a military advisor to the Deputy Minister of Interior for Security for Afghanistan who oversaw an agency of almost 100,000 police officers.

In 2020, during the coronavirus pandemic King, as part of the United States Army National Guard, was called back to duty at Fort Sam Houston in San Antonio, Texas. He helped build field hospitals in New Orleans and in New Jersey at Edison and Newark. King was asked by Governor Kemp to serve on Georgia's Coronavirus Task Force and lead the Emergency Preparedness Committee, which makes sure that there is proper supply equipment. As Insurance and Safety Fire Commissioner, he has asked health insurers not to cancel health policies for non-payment until further notice and for insurers to waive all co-payments for COVID-19 testing.

Awards and decorations
 Army Distinguished Service Medal
 Legion of Merit
 Bronze Medal (with 1 Bronze Oak Leaf Cluster)
 Combat Infantryman Badge
 Meritorious Service Medal (with 1 Bronze Oak Leaf Cluster)
 NATO award for his service in both Bosnia and Afghanistan
 Army Commendation Medal (with 2 Bronze Oak Leaf Clusters)
 Army Achievement Medal (with 1 Bronze Oak Leaf Cluster)
 Joint Meritorious Unit Award
 Army Meritorious Unit Commendation
 Army Reserve Components Achievement Medal (with 1 Silver and 3 Bronze Oak Leaf Clusters)
 National Defense Service Medal (with 1 Bronze Service Star)
 Armed Forces Expeditionary Medal
 Afghanistan Campaign Medal (with 2 Bronze Service Stars)
 Iraq Campaign Medal (with 2 Bronze Service Stars)
 Global War on Terrorism Service Medal
 Armed Forces Reserve Medal (with Gold Hourglass, M Device and Numeral 4)
 Army Service Ribbon
 Overseas Service Ribbon (with Numeral 3)
 North Atlantic Treaty Organization Medal (with 1 Bronze Star)
 Georgia Commendation Medal
 Georgia National Guard Service Medal
 Georgia Special Operations Ribbon
 Georgia State Active Duty Ribbon
 Combat Infantryman Badge
 Combat Action Badge
 El Salvador gold medal for achievement (El Salvador)
 Chief's Blue Star, injury in the line of duty (Atlanta Police Department)

Promotions

See also
 COVID-19 pandemic in the state of Georgia

References

American politicians of Mexican descent
Georgia National Guard personnel
Living people
National Guard (United States) generals
NATO personnel in the Bosnian War
State insurance commissioners of the United States
United States Army personnel of the Iraq War
United States Army personnel of the War in Afghanistan (2001–2021)
Year of birth missing (living people)